The 2005–06 Western Kentucky Hilltoppers men's basketball team represented Western Kentucky University during the 2005–06 NCAA Division I men's basketball season. The Hilltoppers were led by head coach Darrin Horn and Sun Belt Conference Player of the Year Anthony Winchester.  The team won the East Division Championship and finished 2nd in the Sun Belt Basketball tournament.  They participated in the National Invitation Tournament where they were defeated by eventual champion, South Carolina.
Winchester and future NBA player Courtney Lee were named to the All SBC team.  Elgrace Wilborn and Winchester made the SBC All-Tournament team.

Schedule

|-
!colspan=6| Regular season
 
|-

|-
!colspan=6| 2006 Sun Belt Conference men's basketball tournament

|-
!colspan=6| 2006 National Invitation Tournament

References

Western Kentucky
Western Kentucky Hilltoppers basketball seasons
Western Kentucky
Western Kentucky Basketball, Men's
Western Kentucky Basketball, Men's